Gaurav Singh may refer to:

 Gaurav Singh (Mizoram cricketer) (born 1999), Indian cricketer
 Gaurav Singh (Uttarakhand cricketer) (born 1996), Indian cricketer